Aaron was an ancient Christian monk in Southern Egypt who lived during the fourth and early fifth centuries AD. He is venerated as a saint in the Coptic Orthodox Church of Alexandria. He has an annual feast in that church on 22 Paopi (October 19 in the Gregorian calendar). References to this alleged feast cannot be found in the Coptic Synaxarium or Calendar on this date.

References

Bibliography 
Holweck, F. G. A Biographical Dictionary of the Saints. St. Louis, MO: B. Herder Book Co. 1924.

Christian saints in unknown century
Coptic Orthodox saints
Year of death unknown
Year of birth unknown